Bonnie Fagan, now known as Bonnie Chew, is an activist and advocate for her Indigenous heritage, and has sat on the Victorian Aboriginal Heritage Council.

Early and personal life

Bonnie Fagan was born in 1979 in Footscray, Victoria, Australia. She was born into the Wadawurrung community. In 1987 her family moved to Talbot, Victoria, where Fagan was educated at Talbot Primary School, and Maryborough High School. She married Andy Chew in 2012.

Career

Wathaurung Aboriginal Corp
Bonnie Chew was Cultural Heritage Coordinator at Wadawurrung (Wathaurung Aboriginal Corp) from 2008 to 2011. The Wadawurrung (Wathaurung Aboriginal Corp) are the traditional owners and Registered Aboriginal Party of the land encompassing Ballarat and Geelong. She worked with the community, archaeologists, developers, anthropologists, ecologists and government authorities on about 126 projects to preserve the Wadawurrung cultural heritage.

Federation University Aboriginal Education Centres
Between 2011 and August 2016 Chew was manager of Federation University Australia's (formerly University of Ballarat) Aboriginal Education Centres, learning needs of Indigenous students across multiple centers. She also teaches Indigenous Studies in the School of Education and Arts. She has conducted welcoming ceremonies on behalf of the Wadawurrung Elders, including notable events, like the Ballarat Sitting event at the Parliament of Victoria in 2012, and the installation of Chancellor Paul Hemming in 2012. In 2012 she launched the University of Ballarat's second Reconciliation Action Plan.

Victorian Aboriginal Heritage Council
Chew was appointed to the Council of the  Victorian Aboriginal Heritage Council in December 2012. The Council is composed of up to eleven Traditional Owners appointed by the Minister for Aboriginal Affairs. All members reside in Victoria and are experienced in cultural heritage management.

13th World Conference of the League of Historical Cities
In April 2012, Chew was a City of Ballarat Representative at the 13th World Conference of the League of Historical Cities in Vietnam. The conference was "Defining Universal Heritage Challenges and Solutions."  Mayor Cr Mark Harris and Chew presented a painting by Albert Fagan, Wadawurrung Elder, to the Mayor of Hue City, Vietnam.

Speaking engagements
In 2010 she spoke at a workshop at the Melbourne Water Managing Country Together Gathering 2010 entitled "Cultural Heritage and protocols from Wadawurrung’s perspective".

Publications
 Bonnie Fagan with Robyn Brandenburg & Liz Crothers "An Aboriginal Pathway to Learning: My Story: A Conversation with Bonnie Fagan" IN Brandenburg, Robyn & Wilson, Jacqueline, Pedagogies for the Future: Leading Quality Learning and Teaching in Higher Education, Sense Publishers, 2013.

Artwork

An original painting by Bonnie Chew was used for the cover or the book Pedagogies for the Future: Leading Quality Learning and Teaching in Higher Education by Robyn Brandenburg add Jacqueline Wilson. The work is now held in the Federation University Australia Art Collection.

References

External links
 It's a Step Forward Moneghetti
 Royal Commission, p. 20

1979 births
Living people
Activists from Melbourne
Indigenous Australian people
21st-century Australian women
20th-century Australian women